The Change is an upcoming British comedy drama series written and created by Bridget Christie for Channel 4. Made by Expectation Entertainment and directed by Al Campbell, the six-part series is produced by Lisa Mitchell, and executive produced by Bridget Christie, Nerys Evans and Morwenna Gordon. Joining Christie in the cast are Liza Tarbuck, Omid Djalili, Paul Whitehouse, Monica Dolan and Jim Howick.

Synopsis
Linda (Christie) has an existential crisis at 50 years-old after being informed she has started the menopause. She finds her old Triumph motorcycle and goes on a pilgrimage around her old haunts in the Forest of Dean.

Cast
 Bridget Christie as Linda
 Monica Dolan as Carmel 
 Omid Djalili as Steve
 Jim Howick as Verderer
 Liza Tarbuck as Siobhain
 Tanya Moodie as Joy
 Paul Whitehouse as Tony
 Jerome Flynn as Pig Man
 Susan Lynch as Eel sister

Production
The show was announced to have been commissioned in March 2022 produced by Lisa Mitchell, and executive produced by Bridget Christie, Nerys Evans and Morwenna Gordon. In July 2022 it was revealed that the series has started filming and that Howick, Djalili, Whitehouse, Tarbuck and Dolan had joined the cast. Later, Susan Lynch was revealed to have joined the cast as an Eel sister. Filming took place on location in the Forest of Dean. Christie was herself brought up in Gloucestershire near the Forest of Dean and had in 2021 suffered some of the symptoms explored in the series.

Broadcast
The series is expected to air in 2023.

References

External links

2023 British television series debuts
2020s British comedy television series
Television in the United Kingdom
Channel 4 comedy
English-language television shows